Rezaul Karim Rehan (born 6 September 1968) is a retired Bangladeshi footballer who played as a defender for the Bangladesh national football team during the late 80s and early 90s. He started his career in Dhaka with Muktijoddha Sangsad KC in the Dhaka Second Division, which was the second-tier league in Bangladesh back then.

International career
Rehan played in the Sylhet District League before going on to play in Dhaka. He captained Bangladesh U19 at the 1990 AFC Youth Championship qualifiers. He was part of the Bangladesh national football team during the 1987 South Asian Games, 1989 South Asian Games, 1988 AFC Asian Cup qualifiers, 1990 FIFA World Cup qualifiers, 1994 FIFA World Cup qualifiers and also during the 1990 Asian Games.

When Bangladesh took on India in the second group-stage match of the 1989 South Asian Games, they managed to take the lead through Nurul Haque Manik, however after a challenge from Rehan in the penalty box, Bangladesh conceded a late penalty which led to captain Elias Hossain pushing the referee in anger, earning him a ban from international football. 

During the 1994 FIFA World Cup qualifiers return game against Japan, Bangladesh displayed a decent performance, and although the Japanese took the lead within 2 minutes, Bangladesh equalized soon. Nonetheless, after two blunders from substitute keeper Sayeed Hassan Kanan and a red card handed out to Rehan, the game finished as a 4-1 defeat. Rehan's national career soon ended the same year.

References

1968 births
Living people
Bangladeshi footballers
Bangladesh international footballers
Association football defenders
People from Sylhet District
Muktijoddha Sangsad KC players
Abahani Limited (Dhaka) players
Mohammedan SC (Dhaka) players
Asian Games competitors for Bangladesh
Footballers at the 1990 Asian Games